The 2005 Robert Morris Colonials football team represented Robert Morris University in the 2005 NCAA Division I-AA football season. The Colonials were led by 12th-year head coach Joe Walton and played their home games at Joe Walton Stadium. They were a member of the Northeast Conference.

Schedule

References

Robert Morris
Robert Morris Colonials football seasons
Robert Morris Colonials football